Will Leitch is a Northern Irish journalist who has worked for the BBC since 1990. His work for the BBC has included covering those killed during the Troubles and the Irish Catholic child abuse scandal, as well as other more general news coverage.

He delivered a response on behalf of the BBC to Jenny Taylor's Catherwood Lecture in 2015, which criticised the BBC's religion coverage.

Leitch studied at Queen's University Belfast.

References

External links
 

Living people
Journalists from Northern Ireland
BBC newsreaders and journalists
Alumni of Queen's University Belfast
Year of birth missing (living people)